Bloomington GO Station is a train and bus station along the GO Transit network, located in the extreme northeast corner of Richmond Hill, Ontario. The station primarily serves the community of Oak Ridges and the town of Whitchurch–Stouffville. It is the northern terminus of the Richmond Hill line train service which connects to Union Station in Toronto. The station opened to the public on June 28, 2021.

Construction of the station began in March 2017, a few months after the completion of the Gormley GO Station which opened in December 2016. The station site cost an estimated $82.4 million to develop, (final cost unconfirmed publicly) and the multi-level parking structure and integrated station building was built to satisfy LEED Gold certification.

Station facilities

The station is located on the south side of Bloomington Road (York Regional Road 40) on the east side of the Canadian National Railway line and west of Highway 404, and consists of a single platform, building, bus loop, kiss and ride, and 998 parking spaces, 760 of which are in a 3-level parking garage. Land is reserved for a future carpool parking lot managed by the Ministry of Transportation of Ontario.

Service
, Bloomington GO is served by five round trips per weekday; all Toronto-bound during the morning and returning northbound during the afternoon. Additional weekday service to Toronto is provided by the 61 GO bus.

References

External links
Bloomington GO Station construction at Metrolinx

, Metrolinx video published June 28, 2021
 published on 29 June 2021

GO Transit railway stations
Railway stations in Richmond Hill, Ontario
Railway stations in Canada opened in 2021
2021 establishments in Ontario